Michael Curley may refer to:

Michael Joseph Curley (1879–1947), American Roman Catholic archbishop
Michael Curley (footballer) (1912–1973), English footballer

See also
Mick Curley, Gaelic football referee
James Michael Curley (1874–1958), American politician